Takahashi Dam is a gravity dam located in Gifu Prefecture in Japan. The dam is used for power production. The catchment area of the dam is 10.6 km2. The dam impounds about 1  ha of land when full and can store 39 thousand cubic meters of water. The construction of the dam was started on 1916 and completed in 1919.

References

Dams in Gifu Prefecture